Epsilon Pi Tau ( or EPT) is an international honor society for professions in technology. They recognize academics of students, preparation for practitioners and outstanding professionals.

Membership in Epsilon Pi Tau may be at one of three levels: General Member, Laureate Member, and Distinguished Service Member. The latter two levels are attained through professional performance and accomplishment. Members may wear a blue, white, and gold honor cord as part of their academic regalia to denote membership.

It was founded on March 13, 1929.

Epsilon Pi Tau publishes two official publications, The Journal of Technology Studies and The Preceptor.

The Alpha chapter originated at Ohio State University.

References

External links
Official Website
  ACHS Epsilon Pi Tau entry
  Epsilon Pi Tau chapter list at ACHS

Association of College Honor Societies
Student organizations established in 1929
1929 establishments in Ohio